Ligand efficiency is a measurement of the binding energy per atom of a ligand to its binding partner, such as a receptor or enzyme.

Ligand efficiency is used in drug discovery research programs to assist in narrowing focus to lead compounds with optimal combinations of physicochemical properties and pharmacological properties.

Mathematically, ligand efficiency (LE) can be defined as the ratio of Gibbs free energy (ΔG) to the number of non-hydrogen atoms of the compound:

LE = (ΔG)/N

where ΔG = −RTlnKi and N is the number of non-hydrogen atoms. It can be transformed to the equation:

LE = 1.4(−log IC50)/N

Other metrics 

Some suggest that better metrics for ligand efficiency are 
percentage/potency efficiency index (PEI), binding efficiency index (BEI) and surface-binding efficiency index (SEI) because they are easier to calculate and take into account the differences between elements in different rows of the periodic table. It is important to note that PEI is a relative measure for comparing compounds tested in the same conditions (e.g. a single-point assay) and are not comparable at different inhibitor concentrations. Also for BEI and SEI, similar measurements must be used (e.g. always using pKi).

PEI = (% inhibition at a given compound concentration as fraction: 0 – 1.0) / (molecular weight, kDa)
BEI = (pKi, pKd, or pIC50) / (molecular weight, kDa)
SEI = (pKi, pKd, or pIC50) / (PSA/100 Å)

where pKi, pKd and pIC50 is defined as −log(Ki), −log(Kd), or −log(IC
50), respectively. Ki and IC50 in mol/L.

The authors suggest plotting compounds SEI and BEI on a plane and optimizing compounds towards the diagonal and so optimizing both SEI and BEI which incorporate potency, molecular weight and PSA.

There are other metrics which can be useful during hit to lead optimization: group efficiency (GE), lipophilic efficiency/lipophilic ligand efficiency (LipE/LLE), ligand lipophilicity index (LLEAT) ligand efficiency dependent lipophilicity (LELP), fit quality scaled ligand efficiency (LEscale), size independent ligand efficiency (SILE).

See also 
 Drug design
 Drug discovery hit to lead

References 

Drug discovery
Medicinal chemistry